The 2010–11 Atlantic 10 Conference men's basketball season marked the 35th season of Atlantic 10 Conference basketball. The 2011 Atlantic 10 men's basketball tournament was held for the fifth straight year at Boardwalk Hall in Atlantic City, New Jersey.

Preseason
In the 2010 preseason, two new head coaches filled vacant Atlantic 10 positions. Fordham fired Dereck Whittenburg on December 3, 2009, and interim coach Jared Grasso was hired in Whittenburg's absence. The Rams finished the year 2–26, and Grasso was not retained. On March 25, 2010, Tom Pecora was hired from Hofstra, where he coached seven years to a 155–126 record. The Charlotte 49ers fired coach Bobby Lutz on March 15, despite being the team's all-time wins leader with a record of 218–158. In his final season, he led the team to a 19–12 mark but suffered a late season collapse and did not make the NCAA tournament or NIT. He was replaced by Alan Major, an assistant coach at Ohio State for six years, on April 9.

Atlantic 10 media day was held on October 21, 2010. Temple was picked to win their fourth straight A-10 championship by coaches and the media. They received 19 first-place votes, and Xavier and Richmond received three first-place votes each, while Dayton was picked first on one ballot. Richmond's Kevin Anderson was the reigning player of the year, having won the honor in the 2009–10 Atlantic 10 Conference men's basketball season.

Atlantic 10 preseason poll

Atlantic 10 preseason teams

Preseason watchlists
On October 4, 2010, the Wooden Award preseason watch list was released, including three Atlantic 10 players. The watchlist was composed of 50 players who were not transfers, freshmen or medical redshirts.  The list will be reduced to a 30-player mid-season watchlist in December and a final national ballot of about 20 players in March. The Naismith College Player of the Year watchlist of 50 players was announced on November 16, 2010.  In late February, a shorter list of the top 30 players was compiled to prepare for a March vote to narrow the list to four finalists.

Rankings

Conference awards & honors

Weekly honors
Throughout the conference regular season, the Atlantic 10 offices name a player of the week and rookie of the week each Monday.

Atlantic 10 All-Conference teams

NABC
The National Association of Basketball Coaches announced their Division I AllDistrict teams on March 9 to recognize the best men's collegiate basketball student-athletes in the United States. Selected and voted on by member coaches of the NABC, 245 student-athletes were chosen from 24 districts. The selections on this list were then eligible for the State Farm Coaches' Division I All-America teams. The following list represented the Atlantic 10 players chosen to the list. Since District 4 comprised only Atlantic 10 Conference schools, this is equivalent to being named All-Atlantic 10 by the NABC.

First Team
Kevin Anderson (Richmond)
Bill Clark (Duquesne)
Justin Harper (Richmond)
Tu Holloway (Xavier)
Andrew Nicholson (St. Bonaventure)

Second Team
Anthony Gurley (Massachusetts)
Delroy James (Rhode Island)
Ramone Moore (Temple)
Damian Saunders (Duquesne)
Chris Wright (Dayton)

USBWA
On March 10, the U.S. Basketball Writers Association released its 2010–11 Men's All-District Teams, based on voting from its national membership. There were nine regions from coast to coast, and a player and coach of the year were selected in each. The following lists all the Atlantic 10 representatives selected within their respective regions.

District I (ME, VT, NH, RI, MA, CT)
Delroy James (Rhode Island)

District II (NY, NJ, DE, DC, PA, WV)
Andrew Nicholson (St. Bonaventure)

District III (VA, NC, SC, MD)
None Selected

District V (OH, IN, IL, MI, MN, WI)
Tu Holloway (Xavier)

District VI (IA, MO, KS, OK, NE, ND, SD)
None Selected

Postseason

Atlantic 10 tournament

NCAA tournament

National Invitation tournament

2011 NBA Draft
Two Atlantic 10 players were selected in the 2011 NBA Draft on June 23, both in the second round: Justin Harper and Lavoy Allen. Harper was selected with the 32nd pick by the Cleveland Cavaliers and subsequently traded to the Orlando Magic. With the 50th pick of the draft, the Philadelphia 76ers took Lavoy Allen. Tu Holloway declared for early entry in the draft but did not hire an agent and withdrew his name prior to the May 8 deadline.

References